Mehmetçik ("little" here denoting diminutive endearment rather than actual age) is a term generally used to affectionately refer to soldiers of the Turkish Army. It is similar to the colloquialisms Tommy Atkins, Doughboy, and Digger used for soldiers of the British, U.S., and Australian armies.

It is believed that the term is based on Ottoman Army Sergeant Bigalı Mehmet Çavuş (1878–1964), who fought during the Gallipoli Campaign of World War I.

See also 
 Respect to Mehmetçik Monument
 Poilu
 Johnny Turk

References 

Ottoman Empire in World War I
Military of the Ottoman Empire
Turkish Land Forces
Placeholder names